Very Important People is a British television sketch show starring Morgana Robinson, Terry Mynott, Francine Lewis and Liam Hourican. The series comprises six episodes and was broadcast on Channel 4 in 2012. Robinson and Mynott perform impressions of celebrities throughout the show.

Characters
Characters in the show included: Adele, Jennifer Aniston, David Attenborough, Christine Bleakley, Frankie Boyle, Russell Brand, Charlie Brooker, Alan Carr, Natalie Cassidy, Amy Childs, Cheryl Cole, Fearne Cotton, Simon Cowell, Brian Cox, Sophie Dahl, Danny Dyer, Noel Fielding, Liam Gallagher, Noel Gallagher, Nick Grimshaw, Bear Grylls, Perez Hilton, Jessie J, Christian Jessen, Tom Jones, Kerry Katona, Martine McCutcheon, David Mitchell, Barack Obama, Katy Perry, Katie Price, Kate Middleton, Gordon Ramsay, Jonathan Ross, Mickey Rourke, Charlie Sheen, Stacey Solomon, Vince Vaughan, David Walliams, Kimberley Walsh, Owen Wilson and Terry Wogan.

Series
The first series premiered for 6 half-hour episodes every Friday from 27 April to 1 June 2012 at 9.30-10pm. A second series had been ordered and started production in the third week of October. However, it was announced on 12 December 2012 that Very Important People would not be returning for a new series and was subsequently axed.

Series 1 (2012)
Series 1 began on Friday 27 April 2012, and consisted of six episodes.

Series 2
Work on a second series started in October 2012. The series was planned to feature real celebrity guests and more worldwide celebrities, rather than mainly British celebrities. On 12 December 2012, it was announced that Very Important People would in fact not be returning and that Robinson had stopped working on impressions.

References

External links
 Very Important People at Channel 4
 

2012 British television series debuts
2012 British television series endings
2010s British television sketch shows
Channel 4 sketch shows
English-language television shows